Dale Power (born October 2, 1949) is a former top-ranked Canadian tennis player.

Born in Toronto, Ontario, Power held the best singles Davis Cup record by winning percentage (6–2) of any Canadian player.  Power also has the distinction of having played in the longest set in Davis Cup history, a second set that was won by Colombian Álvaro Betancourt 24-22 in a match won by Power in 5 sets in a 1976 tie.

Power was the top-ranked player in Canada for 10 of 12 years, winning the Canadian Closed Championship for singles 7 times.  He failed however to win a single top-tier (grand prix) professional tour match, going 0-11.  His highest singles ranking was World No. 210, achieved in June, 1976.

In August 2006 Power was inducted into the Canadian Tennis Hall of Fame.

Power was also a skilled hockey player, and was drafted by the Montreal Canadiens in 1969, before deciding to concentrate exclusively on his tennis career. Leaving hockey a year later for four years, he returned for the 1974-75 season to play for the Fort Wayne Komets leading the team in scoring with 29 goals and a total of 78 pts. Only after a knee injury did he decide to return full-time to tennis.

Power is currently a Tennis Professional at the Granite Club in Toronto. He has one daughter, Sarah.

References

External links
 
 
 

1949 births
Living people
Canadian ice hockey centres
Canadian male tennis players
Canadian people of Irish descent
Fort Wayne Komets players
Montreal Canadiens draft picks
Peterborough Petes (ice hockey) players
Port Huron Flags (IHL) players
St. Catharines Black Hawks players
Tennis players from Toronto